Leena Khamis (born 19 June 1986) is an Australian soccer player who plays for Perth Glory in the A-League Women.

Biography
Khamis was born in the Sydney suburb of Camden and is of Assyrian heritage. Her family is heavily involved in football, her father played the game before emigrating to Australia from Iraq and two of her sisters are involved at Sydney FC. Her older sister, Linda, is an assistant coach and her younger sister, Sham, is a team-mate.

Playing career
She represented Australia at the 2004 FIFA World Under 19 Women's Championship in Thailand. She finished the inaugural W-League season as top scorer with 7 goals, winning the Golden Boot award.

Khamis made her full international debut for Australia in July 2008 in a match against China in Beijing.

After playing at Sydney FC since their inaugural season, Khamis signed with Western Sydney Wanderers for the 2018–19 season. She was one of several players who made the switch from Sydney FC to rivals Western Sydney during the offseason.

Khamis departed Western Sydney Wanderers ahead of the 2021–22 A-League Women season.

In January 2022, Khamis joined A-League Women club Perth Glory on a short-term injury replacement contract, due to injuries to Cyera Hintzen, Susan Phonsongkham, and Demi Koulizakis.

International goals
Scores and results list Australia's goal tally first.

Honours

Club
 Sydney FC
 W-League Premiership: 2009, 2010–11
 W-League Championship: 2009

Country
 Australia
 AFC Women's Asian Cup: 2010
 AFF Women's Championship: 2008
 OFC U-20 Women's Championship: 2004

Individual
 W-League Golden Boot: 2008–09

References

External links
Sydney FC profile

1986 births
Living people
Australian women's soccer players
Macarthur Rams FC players
Sydney FC (A-League Women) players
Western Sydney Wanderers FC (A-League Women) players
Canberra United FC players
Perth Glory FC (A-League Women) players
A-League Women players
2011 FIFA Women's World Cup players
2015 FIFA Women's World Cup players
Fortuna Hjørring players
New South Wales Institute of Sport alumni
Australia women's international soccer players
Women's association football forwards
Australian people of Assyrian descent
Assyrian women's footballers
Soccer players from Sydney